Statistics of Nemzeti Bajnokság I in the 1943/1944 season.

Overview
It was contested by 16 teams, and Nagyváradi AC won the championship.

League standings

Results

References

Hungary - List of final tables (RSSSF)

Nemzeti Bajnokság I seasons
Hun
1943–44 in Hungarian football